The Head of the Minister of Defence's military cabinet is the head of the military cabinet and staff of the Minister of Defence within the military and government of France.

List 
 General André Martin (1958–1959)
Counter Admiral Yves Goupil (April 1984 – March 1988)

 Admiral Jacques Lanxade (March 1988 – April 1989)

 General Marc Monchal (17 April 1989 –17 May 1991)

 General Jean Rannou (17 May 1991 – 23 May 1994)
 General Philippe Mercier (24 May 1994 – 31 August 1995)
 General Raymond Germanos (1 September 1995 – 14 July 1998)
 General Bernard Thorette (15 July 1998 – 31 July 2002)
 Vice Admiral François Dupont (1 August 2002 – 31 August 2005)
 Counter Admiral Xavier Païtard (1 September 2005 – 30 August 2010)
General Denis Mercier (30 August 2010 – 10 September 2012)
General Antoine Noguier (10 September 2012 – 1 August 2014)
Counter Admiral Pascal Ausseur (1 August 2014 – 2 August 2015)
Vice Admiral Jean Casabianca (2 August 2015 – 1 September 2018)
Counter Admiral Pierre Vandier (1 September 2018 – 1 September 2020)

General Fabien Mandon (since 1 September 2020)

References 

French military staff

Ministry of Armed Forces (France)